Septoria rhododendri is a fungal plant pathogen infecting rhododendrons.

References

External links
 Index Fungorum
 USDA ARS Fungal Database

rhododendri
Fungal plant pathogens and diseases
Ornamental plant pathogens and diseases
Fungi described in 1877